Adelbert William Mason (October 29, 1883 – December 31, 1962) was a Major League Baseball player for the Washington Senators and the Cincinnati Reds. Prior to his professional debut, Mason, a pitcher, played at the college level for Rollins College. The school's baseball program started in 1895 and Mason was their first player to play at the major league level.

Mason would later go on to marry Dorothy Temple, who was the daughter of Pittsburgh Pirates' part-owner, William Chase Temple, and granddaughter of former major league pitcher, Jimmy Wood.

References

External links
 
 

1883 births
1962 deaths
Baseball players from New York (state)
Baltimore Orioles (IL) players
Cincinnati Reds players
Des Moines Boosters players
Jersey City Skeeters players
Los Angeles Angels (minor league) players
Montreal Royals players
Rollins Tars baseball coaches
Rollins Tars baseball players
Rollins Tars football coaches
Schenectady Frog Alleys players
Washington Senators (1901–1960) players